Gala León García  (born 23 December 1973) is a former professional tennis player from Spain. On 21 September 2014, she was announced as the new Davis Cup captain for the Spanish national men's tennis team.

WTA career finals

Singles: 5 (1 title, 4 runner-ups)

Doubles: 2 (2 runner-ups)

ITF finals

Singles: 11 (6–5)

Doubles: 8 (2–6)

Grand Slam singles performance timeline

External links
 
 
 

1973 births
Living people
Tennis players from Madrid
Spanish female tennis players